The Purdue Varsity Glee Club is one of the principal vocal groups of Purdue University. It sings a wide variety of music comprising novelty, patriotic, classical, inspirational, jazz, pop, and barbershop genres. The group currently consists of roughly 60-70 tenors and basses, includes a live accompanying band, and is one of six ensembles associated with Purdue Musical Organizations. In the fall of 2018, the Purdue Varsity Glee Club celebrated its 125th anniversary.

History
The Purdue Varsity Glee Club was founded in 1893 with 11 members, under the direction of Lafayette organist Cyrus Dadswell. At the time, Purdue University was an agricultural and engineering school without a strong musical tradition. In 1910, under the direction of Edward J. Wotawa, the Glee Club composed the fight song “Hail Purdue”, originally titled "Purdue War Song". During the 1920s and 1930s, directors Paul Smith and Albert Stewart led and expanded the organization. 

Al Stewart was refused funding by the university president, thus early funding came from Indianapolis pharmaceutical magnate, Josiah K. Lilly Sr. Lacking regular rehearsal space, the organization was considered a campus orphan. Lillian Stewart, wife of then comptroller R.B. Stewart, offered her living room as rehearsal space. However, as the Glee Club gathered more admirers, University President Edward C. Elliot yielded and formalized Al Stewart's position, hired a staff, and provided rehearsal space. 

The first official space for the Glee Club was in the “Music Penthouse,” the top floor of University Hall, but eventually dedicated rehearsal, office and equipment space was provided over 5 floors in the southwest corner of the newly built Purdue Hall of Music. After decades in the Hall of Music, Ralph and Bettye Bailey Hall was built at the corner of Grant Street and Northwestern Avenue specifically for Purdue Musical Organizations, whose ensembles moved there in 2014. The building was built primarily with private donations.

Traditions
Tradition is considered a major aspect of the Purdue Varsity Glee Club. Members are required keep their hair short and their faces clean-shaven. The standard attire for most performances is a traditional white tie full dress tuxedo. Alternatively, black suits and ties are occasionally worn, usually only featured at certain occasions. During casual events, the group wears matching "travel attire" consisting of jeans, white sneakers, a Purdue Varsity Glee Club polo, and a track jacket. Members must also maintain credible academic grades and have "excellence in character." Additional traditions are listed as follows:

Excellence
The Glee Club's primary tradition is excellence in academics and character. The Purdue Varsity Glee Club boasts a long history of producing courteous and respectful gentlemen.

The Purdusirs and Purdusires
The Purdusirs is a leadership group composed of juniors and seniors. Each "sir" leads a committee.  Such committees change frequently, but usually include Advancement, Public Relations, Properties, Rehearsal Room Lounge & Transportation, Scholarship, Recruitment, Merchandise, Social Media, and Performance Preparation. Additionally, a manager and assistant manager oversee the entire glee club. Each sir is distinguishable by gold and black ribbons worn across the chest of their full dress.  

The Purdusires is a parallel organization composed of administration, faculty, and staff members.  Each "sire" is individually assigned to a committee and acts as an advisor to their respective committee.

Mingling
Members of the Glee Club spend a short time mingling with audience members after performances. This allows the singers to show their appreciation as well as to connect with interested individuals.

The Carnation
White carnation boutonnières are traditionally worn by the Glee Club with the full dress attire.  After a performance, traditionally, each member pins his carnation on the woman of his choice.

The Medallion
The medallions worn by the Glee Club were originally furnished by the National Multiple Sclerosis Society in gratitude for charity work. In 1990, the NMSS discontinued the production of these medallions. In the fall of 1991, however, the Glee Club acquired new medallions with the Purdue seal on the front and Glee Club Pete on the back, commemorating the group's upcoming centennial (1893–1993). The Purdue seal has two prominent features. The griffin symbolizes strength in medieval heraldry. The three part shield represents education, research, and service.

The Lavalier
During their last season with the Glee Club, graduating members are given the opportunity to recognize two important people in their lives by presenting them with a lavalier.

Glee Club Pete 
Glee Club Pete is the traditional mascot of the Purdue Varsity Glee Club.  It is a variant of the university's official mascot, Purdue Pete, wearing a top hat and full dress uniform similar to that of the Glee Club.    

The symbol originated as a joke in 1954, when Al Stewart and the Glee Club were performing for the Rotary Club of North Manchester, Indiana. One of the men of the Rotary Club by the name of Slim Warren took the traditional Purdue Pete and made a few modifications. Slim fashioned a 4-foot replica of Pete dressed in the complete Glee Club full-dress outfit and positioned him at the side of the stage. Stewart and the Glee Club took up a liking with the modified Purdue Pete so much that they adopted him as their official mascot.

World Travels
The Purdue Varsity Glee Club has traveled throughout the continental United States, and abroad to Europe and also to China, the South Pacific, and South Africa. The Glee Club embarked in May of 2017 on tour of Poland and the Baltic states (Estonia, Latvia and Lithuania). Their most recent trip in May of 2019 included a two-week tour of Scotland and the United Kingdom with the Purdue Bells. As ambassadors, the Glee Club shares and represents the university's name and image all over the world.

Purdue Christmas Show
The Purdue Varsity Glee Club is featured in the Purdue Christmas Show, a seasonal performance that takes place in the Edward C. Elliott Hall of Music. 

The first Christmas Show was held in 1933 in Fowler Hall.  There are multiple performances of the Purdue Christmas show each year over the first weekend in December. The Christmas show is made up of performances by the Varsity Glee Club, the Purduettes, the Purdue Bells, University Choir, Heart & Soul, PMO Kids Choir and the All Campus and Community Chorale.

Construction on the sets for the Christmas show begins in the summer. It takes three months to build the set, and two weeks to put it on stage and fine tune the songs. Hundreds of gallons of paint and nearly 1,000 yards of fabric are used to create the sets, props, floor drop, screens, and the custom curtain.

Specialties
Within the Purdue Varsity Glee Club are small subgroups known as specialties. Each specialty concentrates on a particular genre of music and consists of 4 to 8 members. These groups are commonly featured, usually performing two songs each per show. Members of the glee club audition annually for spots in the specialties, and so the member roster varies from season to season.

Ba-Na-Na
BaNaNa is the oldest specialty group within the Purdue Varsity Glee Club. It is made up of 4 members and sings songs primarily from the 1950s and 1960s. They often wear black leather jackets or letterman sweaters in tribute to the 1950s youth and greaser style. Members typically behave humorously and introduce themselves with pick-up lines.

Lighthouse
Lighthouse, consisting of 4 members, typically sings contemporary gospel music. Occasionally, the specialty performs at churches apart from the rest of the glee club during Sunday morning services.

Flashbacks
Flashbacks is a specialty that sings music from 1970s and 1980s. The group is made up of 4 members.

Voiceovers
Voiceovers is an a cappella group singing a wide variety of music without the accompaniment of the band. The specialty typically contains 6-8 members.

Directors of the Purdue Varsity Glee Club
Cyrus Dadswell (1893) - Organist, first director of The Purdue Varsity Glee Club
The glee club went through five directors in the first five years.
E.J. Wotawa (1910) - Former student, took over directing
Paul & Helen Smith (1920 - 1927)
Al Stewart (1932 - 1974) - First full-time director, founded Purdue Musical Organizations, acquired costumes, staff, and rehearsal space.
Bill Luhman (1974 - 1982) - PMO's Purdue Bells started under his direction
William Allen (1982 - 1989)
Brian Breed (1989 - 2007) - Conducted many tours and spread the Purdue Varsity Glee Club's reputation 
Gerritt J. Vandermeer (Jan 2008 - May 2008) - Interim Glee Club alumnus who led the group on its international trip to South Africa.
William E. Griffel (June 2008 – present)

References

External links
 Purdue Varsity Glee Club website

Glee clubs
Musical groups from Indiana
Musical groups established in 1893
Purdue University
1893 establishments in Indiana